Celia Hunter (January 13, 1919 – December 1, 2001) was an American environmentalist and conservationist.  She was conferred the highest award by the Sierra Club, The John Muir Award, in 1991. She was presented the highest award by the Wilderness Society, The Robert Marshall Award, in 1998.

Early life
Celia M. Hunter was born January 13, 1919, in Arlington, Washington  and was raised a Quaker on a small farm during the Great Depression.  Being raised a Quaker instilled values in her that she carried throughout her life.  Hunter's values gave her the confidence to follow dreams like becoming a pilot, even though they were unconventional paths for women. In Hunter's young adult years she worked as a clerk for Weyerhaeuser Timber Company. On her way to work, she drove past Everett Airport. Her first flight lesson was the week following her 21st birthday, and she was immediately addicted. 

Environmentalist and conservationist have become synonymous with Hunter; however, when she first came to Alaska, she did not consider herself a conservationist or an environmentalist.

Career

Military service as a pilot
Hunter trained as a pilot and eventually served as a pilot during World War II, becoming a member of the Women Airforce Service Pilots, also known as the WASPs, and graduating with class 43-W5. Hunter flew planes from the factories to training centers and ports of embarkation throughout the USA.  She successfully completed each upgrading until she was qualified to fly the most sophisticated fighter planes in the US military.

The US Ferrying Division ruled that women should not be allowed to ferry military fighter planes any farther north than Great Falls, Montana.  "We ferried them from factories clear across the US, but 'sorry, gals, turn them over to the men here' and they got to fly them on the Northwest Staging Route through Edmonton, Fort Nelson, Watson Lake, and Whitehorse to Fairbanks," Hunter told students at Linfield College during a 1997 speech.

Two years later, Hunter and her good friend and fellow WASP, Ginny Hill Wood, decided that they would get to Fairbanks on their own, just to see what their male colleagues had been talking about. They made a deal with an Alaskan pilot, who was in Seattle, to fly two of his planes to Fairbanks. It took 27 days to fly from Seattle to Fairbanks, even though the total flying time added up to only 30 hours. Wood's plane had unairworthy fabric and no heat. The two women nicknamed it "Li'l Igloo." Before leaving for Fairbanks, Hunter and Wood spent a semester at school in Sweden, then spent 10 months bicycling throughout Europe, which was still suffering the devastation inflicted by the war. To get back to the United States, they hitchhiked across the Atlantic Ocean on a tanker.
“We bought a jeep station wagon and drove cross-country to Seattle, but found the U.S. too affluent for our tastes [so we] headed back to Alaska,” exclaimed Woods on her journey back to Alaska.

The two women arrived in Fairbanks on January 1, 1947, in the midst of a thick snowstorm. The temperature was almost  and the only scheduled airline could not fly in those temperatures. Finding themselves stranded, Hunter and Wood secured jobs in a start-up travel agency. Hunter served as a flight attendant on the first-ever tourist trips to Kotzebue and Nome and planned the first sightseeing tours of Fairbanks. In autumn 1947, Hunter enrolled in the University of Stockholm in a special course designed for American GI students. After a semester in Sweden, Hunter and Wood spent ten months bicycling through war-torn Europe and eventually hitchhiked on tankers back to the United States, where they returned to Alaska.

Camp Denali

Hunter and Wood, together with Wood's husband, decided to start Camp Denali, which was planned to be similar to the hut systems in Europe, with simple accommodations coupled with outdoor activities.  The threesome staked out a Trade and Manufacturing Site claim under the Homestead Act along the then-western boundary of Denali National Park, with a magnificent view of Denali (formerly known as Mount McKinley), and opened for business in 1952. Their management philosophy was simple, "to create a setting in which our guests, staff, and even casual visitors would be aware of the wonders of the natural world that surrounded us."  Camp Denali's management closely reflected Hunter's philosophy on life.  "We specialized in providing healthy, sustaining meals, with fresh baked bread and pastries, and we refused to handle either soft drinks or beer in our small store because we didn't want to see the throw-away cans littering the roadsides," Hunter once remarked.   Camp Denali was sold in 1975 and now lies within Denali National Park.

As their business grew, so did their deep respect and love for the natural world. They found themselves increasingly involved in Alaska's issues. When Celia Hunter and Ginny Wood first arrived in Alaska, it was a Territory with approximately 180,000 people.  "Flying across bush Alaska, the entire landscape was a seamless whole, unmarred by man-made boundaries. Alaskans assumed it would always be like this, and they resisted strenuously the setting aside of particular lands to protect them." Alaska was changing rapidly before their eyes and they realized it was going to take a lot of work to protect the Alaskan wildlands they loved.

The trip that Olaus and Mardy Murie made in 1956 to the Sheenjek River at Lost and Lobo Lakes in the foothills of the Brooks Range was the catalyst that started the conservation movement in Alaska. Olaus Murie, a naturalist and wildlife biologist well known for his work in Alaska, dreamed of protecting a large area of the Arctic that extended from the Arctic Ocean, across the Brooks Range, and down into the boreal forest on the opposite side.  After their trip, Murie proposed the creation of the Arctic National Wildlife Refuge to protect an ecosystem large enough to support the great Porcupine River caribou herd and other large populations of wildlife.  Hunter met the Muries on one of their trips through Fairbanks.  "We really supported very strongly what they were trying to do.  Olaus Murie went home and drew lines on the map and we started fighting for setting aside the area," said Hunter.

Soon the group of staunch supporters realized that protecting the Arctic Refuge was going to be harder than expected.  Setting aside the Range was virtually impossible to do through Congress, because the congressional delegation of Alaska was adamantly opposed to any withdrawals of land for conservation purposes.  Hunter and others began fighting for the Refuge unofficially until they decided they would need to form an organization in order to be most effective.  The Alaska Conservation Society (ACS), Alaska's first statewide conservation organization, was formed in 1960, proving a venue for Hunter and others to testify on behalf of the Arctic National Wildlife Refuge (ANWR).  Unfortunately, support for  ANWR came primarily from congressional delegates and other conservationists outside of Alaska, and there was nothing that got the Alaskan delegation more riled up than a bunch of outsiders coming in and telling Alaska how to manage its resources.  Hunter remarked, "OK, if you don't want to listen to people from Outside, you better listen to us."  Voting members of ACS were required to be Alaskan residents.  Despite strong opposition from Alaska's senators and lone congressman, a presidential proclamation by President Dwight D. Eisenhower and Secretary of the Interior Fred Seaton created the Wildlife Refuge shortly before Eisenhower left office in 1960.  Following this success, ACS continued to serve as a vehicle through which Alaskans could be heard on conservation issues.  Hunter acted as the executive secretary of ACS for the next 12 years.

Legacy
Celia Hunter died on December 1, 2001, at age 82. She spent her last night writing letters to Congressmen in support of protecting the Arctic National Wildlife Refuge from oil drilling. Her life spanned an important part of Alaska's history. Hunter was a cornerstone of the conservation movement in Alaska. Her legacy can be shown through her work with the ACS and ACF. 

Hunter's list of accomplishments and her lasting legacy are affirmations that she was an effective leader for over 50 years. In a final radio interview, two weeks prior to her passing, she gave some advice to the future: "I think what I'd like to leave with people your age is the idea that change is possible, but you're going to have to put your energy into it… I'm past eighty and I'm not going to be the mover and shaker of this, but people like you are. And you're going to have to bite the bullet and decide what kind of world you want to live in."

Conservation legacy
Celia Hunter started the Alaska Conservation Foundation (ACF) in 1980, previously known as the Alaska Conservation Society (ACS). Hunter served on the board of trustees for more than 18 years. She spent her time growing the foundation, inspiring the next generation, and protecting the Alaskan wilderness. Shortly before her death, Hunter said "Change is possible, but you have to put your energy into it. You can’t expect me, I’m past 80, to be the mover and the shaker of this, but people like you are. And you’re going to have to bite the bullet and really decide what kind of world you want to live in."

Rampart Dam 
Soon after its formation, ACS found itself opposing two other major battles: Rampart Dam and Project Chariot. Rampart Dam, the first battle was over the proposal to build a dam on the Yukon River at a location known as The Ramparts. The Rampart Dam would have created a lake 300 miles (480 km) long and affected climates and ecosystems clear into the Yukon Territories. As well as submerged numerous small villages, inundated millions of acres of rich waterfowl and wildlife habitat, and displaced large numbers of mammal populations. Celia Hunter, Ginny Wood, and other ACS members worked diligently to expose the shortcomings of the proposal. Rampart Dam would have theoretically produced vast quantities of electrical power and involved the construction of a large aluminum processing complex in Southcentral Alaska to take advantage of the cheap power. Debates took place in Fairbanks and were largely attended by the public. Woods recalls Hunter talking about the economics of the project and not just about saving moose and ducks. By doing her homework, Hunter was successful in exposing common sense complications and problems with the proposal.

Project Chariot 
Hope. Dr. Edward Teller and others from the Atomic Energy Commission (AEC) had come to Alaska to convince residents that atomic power in the Arctic would bring a wealth of benefits to the state. He toured the state and convinced the Alaskan delegation and the Anchorage and Fairbanks Chambers of Commerce of the economic benefits that would result from a permanently open port at Point Hope. Academics at the University of Alaska-Fairbanks were not so easily convinced. The University's professors demanded to know how Dr. Teller and the AEC would identify the impacts of fallout from a nuclear explosion with no pre-blast knowledge of the land and its inhabitants. That was how they got the first Environmental Impact Statement investigation. This was ten years before the National Environmental Policy Act (NEPA) became law under President Nixon. It was discovered that AEC was more interested in experimenting with the blasts and with the radioactive fallout than Alaska's economic and social well-being, which led to the downfall of Project Chariot.

The ACS became involved, and the March 1961 issue of the ACS News Bulletin explored the broader significance of Project Chariot. Data from dedicated University scientists like Dr. Leslie Viereck, Don Foote, and Dr. William Pruitt provided indisputable evidence for their case. Hunter wrote, "The consequences were laid out insofar as they could be known or calculated, and the price Alaska might have to pay in terms of having vast areas so contaminated they could not be utilized, was forecast." The ACS Bulletin was distributed widely in Washington, DC, and reprinted through other organizations such as the Sierra Club. Ginny Wood recalls the effectiveness of the networking: it soon brought the issue of Project Chariot to a national audience. Seeing the Sierra Club briefings, Secretary of Interior Stewart Udall became puzzled as to why the AEC did not go through him on the project and asked to be sent all the information that the Sierra Club was receiving. As a result, ACS developed a direct line to the head of the Department of the Interior, effectively undermining Edward Teller and the AEC.

While Project Chariot was never explicitly canceled and the AEC never admitted that the project was completely misguided and irresponsible, the proposal ceased to gain momentum. The truth of the devastation Project Chariot could have caused was finally realized. "This is how close the US and Alaska came to having their own Chernobyl catastrophe and the perpetrators of the plot were government employees of the AEC and the Lawrence Radiation Lab - people so intent on their own narrow goals that they would willingly have sacrificed everything within northern Alaska to achieve them," Hunter explained.

The disaster was not entirely averted. The battle that Hunter thought was being played out in the open was being played behind closed doors, as well. Before the AEC left Alaska, they imported several tons of radioactive waste and buried it in the vicinity of the proposed harbor site to examine how it disseminated through the ecosystem. Hunter talked about the findings in an interview with Hilary Hilscher, "they were turned down; they realized that they couldn't go ahead and make a nuclear blast because people were already loaded to the gills with the radioactivity. So what did they do but import a bunch of it and bury it and didn't tell anybody and now, 33 years later, it suddenly comes to light. I think those people were absolutely dastardly."

Alaska Conservation Foundation's future 
ACS took on many other battles utilizing both reactive and proactive strategies to protect Alaska's environment. They were instrumental in removing bounties on wolves, a fight that lasted nearly a decade. ACS fought the Susitna Dam project, similar to the Rampart Dam. They worked on community projects preserving open spaces in Fairbanks and were proponents of trail systems as well as alternative transportation. Residents in many Alaskan communities started local ACS chapters to fight issues in their own backyards. ACS chapters worked on their own issues and communicated through the News Bulletin. The organization grew and worked tirelessly for 20 years before finally dissolving. Woods, Hunter, and other leaders realized they no longer had the resources to run such a large organization. They ended the ACS and divided the money up for the Alaska Center for the Environment (ACE), Southeast Alaska Conservation Council (SEACC), and The Northern Alaska Environment Council (NAEC.) The women had established a strong conservation movement throughout Alaska to carry on with needed work.

In 1969 Hunter was offered a position on the Governing Council of the Wilderness Society. In 1976 she was made president and later executive director. She was the first female to head a national environmental organization. In 1972, Hunter was nominated by Secretary of the Interior Rogers C.B. Morton to sit on the Joint Federal-State Land Use Planning Commission where she articulated the environmentalists' viewpoint. She worked with the Commission until it dissolved in 1980 with the passage of the Alaska National Interest Lands and Conservation Act.

Even with her notoriety, Hunter did not stop looking for ways to further conservation in Alaska. In 1980, Celia Hunter and Denny Wilcher started the Alaska Conservation Foundation (ACF) to bring more resources to the conservation movement in Alaska and to continue the statewide networking that had been started with ACS. Hunter served on the ACF Board of Trustees for over 18 years. She served on innumerable other boards including Alaska Natural History Assn., Nature Conservancy, Trustees for Alaska, and The Wilderness Society. Beginning in 1979, Hunter contributed a regular column to the Fairbanks Daily News-Miner offering an alternative voice with environmental and liberal themes to the community. In 1980 the Alaska National Interest Lands and Conservation Act (ANILCA) was passed, doubling the size of the Arctic National Wildlife Range and renaming it the Arctic National Wildlife Refuge.

Mentorship

In the mid and late 1970s, while serving on the Joint Federal-State Land Use Planning Commission for Alaska (headquartered in Anchorage), Hunter became a magnet for mentoring young women arriving in Alaska from the southern states in search of both adventure and participation in one of America's landmark conservation episodes: the apportionment of then-undesignated federal lands into forms with protected status (national parks and national monuments) versus unprotected status (United States Forest Service and Bureau of Land Management), culminating in Congressional passage in 1980 of the Alaska National Interest Lands Conservation Act.

Awards
In 1991 Celia Hunter was conferred the highest award by the Sierra Club, The John Muir Award, for a lifetime of dedicated conservation work, a distinguished record of achievement in national or international conservation causes.

In 1998, Celia Hunter was presented the highest award by the Wilderness Society, The Robert Marshall Award, for her long-term service to and notable influence upon conservation and the fostering of an American land ethic.

In 2001, The Alaska Conservation Foundation presented Celia Hunter and Ginny Wood with the first ever Lifetime Achievement Award, the cornerstone of the Alaska Conservation Hall of Fame.  The ACF has an endowment fund named for Celia M. Hunter, that educates interested, young people for an environmental career.

References

Books
Hammond, Jay.  Tales of Alaska's Bush Rat Governor: The extraordinary autobiography of Jay Hammond, wilderness guide and reluctant politician.  Epicenter Press: Seattle, Fairbanks, 1994
O'Neill, Dan.  The Firecracker Boys.  St. Martin's Griffin: New York, 1994

Articles
Bock, Wally.  "What Do Great Leaders Do Differently?"  Found on World Wide Web at  31 Dec 2000
Johnson, Susan. "Celia Hunter: Portrait of an Activist."  The Alaska Journal, Autumn 1979.
Miller, Debbie.  "Celia Hunter. Found on World Wide Web at  30 June 2002
O'Neill, Dan.  "Bidding Farewell to 'a fine warrior.'" Fairbanks Daily News-Miner 09 Dec. 2001
Seifert, Richard D.  "Celia Hunter: A Brief Biography." Ecology Hall of Fame. Found on WWW at 30 June 2002
Smetzer, Mary Beth.  "Hundreds remember a 'tilter of windmills'." Fairbanks Daily News-Miner 10 Dec. 2001

Video tapes
Alaska Conservation Foundation (ACF):
"Lifetime Achievement Awards Luncheon." 15 Aug. 2001
"Celia Hunter Anchorage Memorial Service." 27 Dec. 2001
"Touchstone: A Video Portrayal of the Grassroots Environmental Movement in Alaska."

Other
 ACF. Celia M. Hunter Alaska Conservation Leadership Endowment Fund. 2002
 Hunter, Celia.  "My Alaska: A Personal Encounter."  Linfield College.  The Jane Claire Dirks-Edmunds Endowed Ecology Lectureship.  McMinnville Oregon, 6 Oct. 1997.
 "Quaker FAQs."  Religious Society of Friends.  Found on WWW at  1 July 2002
 ACF. Jessica Wiles.  "Celia M. Hunter, Life and Leadership." date unknown

1919 births
2001 deaths
American women environmentalists
Aviators from Alaska
People from Denali Borough, Alaska
People from Fairbanks, Alaska
People from Arlington, Washington
Sierra Club awardees
Women Airforce Service Pilots personnel
American conservationists